Song Bao'an (born February 1963) is a Chinese pesticide expert and the current president of Guizhou University. He entered the workforce in August 1986, and joined the Communist Party of China in June 1997. He was a delegate to the 13th National People's Congress.

Biography
Song was born into a military camp in Shenzhen, Guangdong, in February 1963, while his ancestral home is in Yuanjiang, Hunan. He was raised in Shiqian County, Guizhou.  He attended Guizhou University where he received his Bachelor of Science degree in July 1983. After completing his Master of Engineering degree at Shenyang Research Institute of Chemical Industry, he attended Nanjing Agricultural University where he obtained his Doctor of Science degree in December 2003. From 2001 to 2002 he was a visiting scholar at the University of California, Berkeley.

After university, in 1986, he joined the faculty of Guizhou University. In May 2018, he became president of Guizhou University, replacing Chen Jian.

Honours and awards
 1998 State Science and Technology Progress Award (Third Class)
 2007 State Science and Technology Progress Award (Second Class)
 2012 Science and Technology Innovation Award of the Ho Leung Ho Lee Foundation
 2014 State Science and Technology Progress Award (Second Class)
 December 2015 Member of the Chinese Academy of Engineering (CAE)
 2019 State Science and Technology Progress Award (Second Class)

References

1963 births
Living people
People from Shenzhen
Engineers from Guangdong
Guizhou University alumni
Nanjing Agricultural University alumni
Academic staff of Guizhou University
Presidents of Guizhou University
Members of the Chinese Academy of Engineering
Delegates to the 13th National People's Congress